Edwin Kipchirchir Kemboi (born 20 June 1984) is a Kenyan born, male Austrian long-distance runner. He competed in the marathon event at the 2015 World Championships in Athletics in Beijing, China, fishing 32nd.

His personal best is 2:12:58, from the 2013 Rotterdam Marathon.  He won the 2011 Graz Marathon and the 2014 Salzberg Marathon.

See also
 Austria at the 2015 World Championships in Athletics

References

Living people
Place of birth missing (living people)
1984 births
Austrian male long-distance runners
Austrian male marathon runners
World Athletics Championships athletes for Austria